

Players

Competitions

Division Three

League table

Results summary

League position by match

Matches

FA Cup

Littlewoods Cup

Sherpa Vans Trophy

Appearances and goals

References

Books

1988-89
Northampton Town
Northampton Town